The Lenore Marshall Poetry Prize is administered by the Academy of American Poets selected by the New Hope Foundation in 1994. Established in 1975, this $25,000 award recognizes the most outstanding book of poetry published in the United States in the previous year.

The Prize was created in 1975 by the New Hope Foundation of Pennsylvania, which was a philanthropic foundation created by Lenore Marshall and her husband, James Marshall, to "support the arts and the cause of world peace"; Lenore Marshall, a poet, novelist, editor, and peace activist, had died in 1971. Receipt of the prize has been among the distinctions noted by the Library of Congress when the Poet Laureate of the United States is named.

The Prize was initially administered by the Saturday Review magazine. Following the folding of Saturday Review, the Prize was administered by The Nation magazine. In 1995, administration of the Prize became the responsibility of the Academy; the Prize has a permanent endowment. The Prize is still sponsored by The Nation, which usually publishes an article about the poetry of each year's finalists and winner. The cash value of the prize is currently $25,000.

Winners

References

American poetry awards
Awards established in 1975